Centroctena is a genus of moths in the family Sphingidae first described by Walter Rothschild and Karl Jordan in 1903.

Species
Centroctena imitans (Butler 1882)
Centroctena rutherfordi (Druce 1882)

References

Macroglossini
Moth genera
Taxa named by Walter Rothschild
Taxa named by Karl Jordan